Aidan Harris Igiehon (born 17 August 2000) is an Irish college basketball player for the Grand Canyon Antelopes of the Western Athletic Conference (WAC). He previously played for the Louisville Cardinals. Igiehon attended Lawrence Woodmere Academy in New York, where he was a four-star recruit and won three state championships.

Early life
Igiehon was born in the Coombe Women & Infants University Hospital in Dublin, Ireland and grew up in the nearby suburb of Clondalkin. Until he was 12 years old, he played football as a midfielder.

In 2012, Igiehon was introduced to basketball by Dublin Lions coach Mick White, who noticed Igiehon and his friend kicking around a football outside Moyle Park College. White, who was holding under-13 tryouts and needed extra players, invited Igiehon and was impressed by him. Igiehon soon joined the Lions, with whom he learned how to play basketball and quickly improved his game. He also grew about one foot (0.3 m) by the following year. In addition, Igiehon played basketball for Moyle Park College, leading his team to an All-Ireland final. In the summer of 2014, he moved to the United States to enroll at Lawrence Woodmere Academy, a K–12 private school in Woodmere, New York, as an eighth-grader. Igiehon's mother remained in Ireland, while he began living with his aunt and uncle in Brooklyn. He became a starter on his school's varsity basketball team in eighth grade.

High school career
Igiehon played high school basketball for Lawrence Woodmere Academy under head coach Jeff Weiss. Both Weiss and Karim Shabazz, a school physical education teacher and former professional basketball player, helped him adjust to living in the United States. Igiehon sometimes returned to Ireland to meet his mother and play for the Dublin Lions. In his freshman season, he averaged 18 points and 14 rebounds per game, leading his team to a 20-win season. Igiehon also played for the New York Lightning Amateur Athletic Union (AAU) team. In his sophomore season, he averaged 21.5 points and 15 rebounds per game, helping his team to Private Schools Athletic Association (PSAA) and New York State Association of Independent Schools (NYSAIS) Class B titles. Igiehon earned PSAA Most Valuable Player (MVP) and Class B tournament MVP honors. Following the season, he played for the New York Lightning on the Nike Elite Youth Basketball League (EYBL) circuit, averaging 6.2 points and 4.9 rebounds per game.

Igiehon missed most of December in his junior season with an ankle injury. He averaged 21 points and 18 rebounds per game, leading Lawrence Woodmere Academy to a 20–6 record, a New York State Federation Tournament appearance, and an NYSAIS Class B championship. After the season, Igiehon made his Under Armour Association debut with Team Rio, playing alongside five-star recruits Bryan Antoine and Scottie Lewis. He averaged 9.7 points and 6.4 rebounds per game. On October 19, 2018, Igiehon committed to play college basketball for Louisville over Kentucky, Oregon, and St. John's. He was considered a four-star recruit by 247Sports and Rivals, and ESPN ranked him as the 36th best player in the 2019 class. On February 24, 2019, Igiehon led Lawrence Woodmere Academy to a second straight NYSAIS Class B title and third consecutive NYSAIS championship. He also helped his team reach the Federation Tournament Class B semifinals. After averaging 26 points and 18 rebounds per game and guiding his team to a 22–2 record, Igiehon received USA Today All-USA New York first team recognition.

College career
Igiehon did not see much playing time as a freshman at Louisville, partially due to an injured shoulder. As a sophomore, he was limited to five games due to a groin injury and an illness. After the season, Igiehon transferred to Grand Canyon.

Career statistics

College

|-
| style="text-align:left;"| 2019–20
| style="text-align:left;"| Louisville
| 13 || 0 || 4.7 || .625 || – || .375 || 1.3 || .0 || .0 || .2 || 1.0
|-
| style="text-align:left;"| 2020–21
| style="text-align:left;"| Louisville
| 5 || 0 || 8.2 || .714 || – || .375 || 1.6 || .0 || .2 || .2 || 2.6
|- class="sortbottom"
| style="text-align:center;" colspan="2"| Career
| 18 || 0 || 5.7 || .667 || – || .375 || 1.4 || .0 || .1 || .2 || 1.4

Personal life
Both of Igiehon's parents are originally from Lagos, Nigeria. In 2000, his mother Nibokun Omoruyi moved to Ireland, where she raised Igiehon and his older brother Brandon. In 2016, Brandon began playing NCAA Division III soccer for the State University of New York at Potsdam.

References

External links
Louisville Cardinals bio

2000 births
Living people
Centers (basketball)
Irish expatriate basketball people in the United States
Irish men's basketball players
Irish people of Nigerian descent
Irish sportspeople of African descent
Grand Canyon Antelopes men's basketball players
Louisville Cardinals men's basketball players
Lawrence Woodmere Academy alumni
People from Clondalkin
Sportspeople from South Dublin (county)
Power forwards (basketball)
Sportspeople from Dublin (city)